Yu Menglong (born 15 June 1988), also known as Alan Yu, is a Chinese actor, singer and music video director. He is best known for his role in the hit web drama Go Princess Go (2015), as well as the fantasy romance dramas Eternal Love (2017) and The Legend of White Snake (2019).

Career

Beginnings
In 2007, Yu participated in SMG's My Show! My Style!. He emerged as the Top 16 for the Xi'an province. In 2010, Yu joined Hunan TV's Super Boy but was eliminated. The same year, he directed singer Deanna Ding's music video for her single "61 Seconds".

In 2011, he made his acting debut in the short film The Little Prince.

In 2013, Yu competed in Super Boy again; this time entering emerging as one of the Top 10 contestants in the final round. The same year, he released his first single titled "Just Nice".

In 2014, Yu starred in the short film The Rules, which received the Best Independent Film award at the 4th International Micro Film Festival for University.

Rising popularity
In 2015, Yu achieved recognition with his role as 9th prince in the popular historical web drama Go Princess Go. The same year, he released his first album, Toy.

In 2017, Yu gained increased popularity after starring in the hit fantasy-romance drama Eternal Love. He then starred in the fantasy-action drama Xuan-Yuan Sword: Han Cloud alongside Zhang Yunlong.

In 2019, Yu starred in the television adaptation of the Chinese folktale legend Legend of the White Snake as Xu Xian. The same year, Yu starred in modern workplace drama Who's Not Rebellious Youth, and youth sports drama Unstoppable Youth.

In 2020, Yu is set to star in the historical drama The Love Lasts Two Minds.

Filmography

Film

Television series

Television show

Music video

Discography

Albums

Singles

Bibliography

Awards and nominations

References

External links 

 

1988 births
Living people
21st-century Chinese male actors
Chinese male film actors
Chinese male television actors
Super Boy contestants
Male actors from Xinjiang